2002 S.League was the seventh season of Singapore's professional football league. It was won by Singapore Armed Forces, which was their fourth league title.

League table

Foreign players
Each club is allowed to have up to a maximum of 4 foreign players.

Top goalscorers

Source:

References

Singapore Premier League seasons
1
Sing
Sing